Sean Anthony may refer to:
 Sean Anthony (basketball) (born 1986), Filipino-Canadian basketball player
 Sean Anthony (rapper) (born 1982), American rapper